Gianni-Emilio Simonetti (born 4 June 1940) is an Italian artist writer and essayist who was active in the Fluxus and Situationist movements.

External links
 Gianni-Emilio Simonetti on Sharevolution
 Gianni-Emilio Simonetti papers at Yale University
 official website

References

1940 births
Fluxus
Italian artists